Solastranda or Solastranden (English: The Sola Beach) is a  long sandy beach in Norway, located  from Stavanger Airport, Sola and  from Stavanger.  The beach is a popular beach for swimming and sunbathing in the summer. Windsurfing and surfing are popular all-year-round activities at Solastranden.

Sola Strand Hotel that also houses toilets and dressing room facilities is at the south end of the beach. A farm beach resort also offers dining and banquet facilities. There are also traces of German military activity from World War II.  Sola Golfcourse is nearby the beach.

References 

Sola, Norway
Beaches of Norway
Surfing locations in Norway
Golf clubs and courses in Norway